The Brazilian Gymnastics Federation is the national governing body for gymnastics in Brazil. The federation was founded on November 25, 1978.

International competition
The Brazilian Gymnastics Federation (CBG)  is a member of the Pan American umbrella organization Pan American Gymnastics Union (UPAG/PAGU), the South American umbrella organization Confederación Sudamericana de Gimnasia (CONSUGI), as well as the main governing body of the sport, the International Gymnastics Federation (FIG).

See also
 Brazil at the World Artistic Gymnastics Championships
 Brazil women's national gymnastics team
 List of Olympic female artistic gymnasts for Brazil
 List of Olympic rhythmic gymnasts for Brazil

References

External links
 Official website

National members of the PanAmerican Gymnastic Union
Gymnastics
Sports organizations established in 1978
 
1978 establishments in Brazil